Kunihiko Nohara (born February 13, 1982) is a Japanese artist and sculptor. Born in Hokkaido, Japan, Nohara graduated from the Fine Arts Department of Hiroshima City University in 2005 and attended its graduate school for sculpture where in 2007 he earned hist Master of Fine Art in Sculpture. Nohara mostly creates wooden sculptures using camphor and zelkova trees. Additionally, he creates paintings using wood as a medium. Nohara’s motifs are a combination of abstract images and brilliant colors, adding an avant-garde taste to the powerfulness of wooden sculptures. Swimming caps and goggles are distinctive attributes of the characters that Nohara creates.

Since exhibiting in an art fair in Hong Kong 2010, Nohara has exhibited in Taiwan, Singapore, Malaysia, and other locations in Asia. In 2016, Nohara had his large-scale solo exhibition in Hsinchu, Taiwan.

Main exhibitions

Solo exhibitions
2012 - Kunihiko Nohara , gallery, UG, Tokyo
2013 - Kunihiko Nohara , gallery, UG, Tokyo
2014 - Kunihiko Nohara , gallery, UG, Tokyo
2015 - Kunihiko Nohara , gallery, UG, Tokyo
2016 - BREAK TIME, gallery UG, Tokyo
2016 - Floating Diary, iart Gallery, Hsinchu, Taiwan
2017 - Bittersweet, gallery UG, Tokyo

Group exhibitions
2010 - Atsuo Takahashi and Kunihiko Nohara, Gallery Uniglavas Ginzakan, Tokyo
2011 - Rittai Butsubutsu, Bunkamura Gallery, Tokyo
2012 - 6 Japanese Contemporary Sculptors, Mitsukoshi, Tainan
2013 - Urban Legend, Trio Exhibition by Kunihiko Nohara, Gekko Numata, Kentaro Matsukuma, Capital Art Center、Taipei
2013 - Future Temporary, Art Door Gallery, Taipei
2014 - Dialogue with Japanese Contemporary Art, Macpro Gallery、Macau
2014 - Hiroshima City University 20th Anniversary Exhibition, Hiroshima City University, Hiroshima
2014 - Laissez-faire, The Ueno Royal Museum Gallery, Tokyo
2015 - Laissez-faire, The Luxe Art Museum, Singapore
2015 - Exhibition of Gallery UG Private Collection Yayoi Kusama & Kunihiko Nohara, Christie’s Fine Art Storage Services Viewing Gallery, Singapore

Art fairs
2010 - Asia Top Gallery Hotel Art Fair Hong Kong, Grand Hyatt Hong Kong, Hong Kong 
2011 - Young Art Taipei, Sunworld Dynasty Hotel Taipei, Taipei
2011 - Art Taipei, Taipei World Trade Center, Taipei
2012 - Asia Top Gallery Hotel Art fair Hong Kong, Mandarin Oriental Hong Kong, Hong Kong
2012 - Young Art Taipei, Sheraton Grande Taipei Hotel, Taipei
2012 - Art Taipei, Taipei World Trade Center, Taipei
2013 - Bank Art Fair, Island Shangri-La Hong Kong, Hong Kong
2015 - Affordable Art Fair - F1 Pit Building, Singapore
2015 - Art Apart Fair - Park Royal Hotel on Pickering, Singapore
2016 - Art Stage Singapore, Marina Bay Sands, Singapore
2016 - Art Fair Tokyo Kunihiko Nohara Break Time ? Tokyo International Forum, Tokyo
2016 - Bazaar Art Jakarta, The Ritz-Carlton Jakarta Pacific Place, Jakarta
2016 - Art Expo Malaysia Plus - Matrade Exhibition & Convention Centre, Kuala Lumpur 
2016 - 6075 Macau Hotel Art Fair - Regency Hotel Macau, Macau
2017 - Art Stage Singapore - Marina Bay Sands, Singapore
2017 - Art Fair Tokyo - Tokyo International Forum, Tokyo
2017 - Young Art Taipei - Sheraton Grande Taipei Hotel, Taipei

References

External links
gallery UG Kunihiko Nohara

1982 births
Living people
Japanese sculptors
People from Eniwa, Hokkaido